Juliet Simmons (born January 22, 1995) is an American voice actress. She works at Sentai Filmworks for English dub productions. Her notable roles are Tenri Ayukawa in The World God Only Knows, Myucel Foaran in Outbreak Company, Jeanne Kaguya d'Arc in Nobunaga The Fool, Rei in Hamatora, Kurome in Akame ga Kill, Kurumu Ebisuzawa in School-Live!, Goshenite in Land of the Lustrous, Shizuku Kurogane in Chivalry of a Failed Knight, Chiyo Sakura in Monthly Girls' Nozaki-kun and Kasumi Toyama in BanG Dream!.

Career
Simmons created her YouTube channel with the name “JubyPhonic”. She started off by singing covers of songs, most commonly Vocaloid and anime songs. She recorded covers, before becoming a voice actress. Simmons appeared in a podcast type livestream, and a tablet review.

Dubbing roles

Anime

Films

Video games

References

External links
 
 
 
 

1995 births
Living people
Actresses from Houston
American video game actresses
American voice actresses
21st-century American actresses